"Shine It On" is the second single of Estonian musician Maarja Kivi. "Shine It On" was released on 1 September 2006. The single was a bigger hit than her first single "Could You", and reached number #16 at MTV Baltic TOP 20. In Estonia, the single peaked at #9 in the singles' chart.

Track listing
"Radio Edit" 3:30
"Unplugged Version" 3:30
"Extended Version" 5:07
"Classical Version" 3:28
"Video" 3:29

Charts
 #9 Estonia
 #48, Germany
 #43, Austria
 #16, MTV Baltic TOP 20

2006 singles